Ordo Templi Orientis (O.T.O.) is an occult initiatory organization founded at the beginning of the 20th century. The origins of the O.T.O. can be traced back to the German-speaking occultists Carl Kellner, Heinrich Klein, Franz Hartmann, and Theodor Reuss. Later, the O.T.O. was significantly shaped by the English author and occultist Aleister Crowley.

After Crowley's death in 1947, four main branches of the O.T.O. have claimed exclusive descent from the original organization and primacy over the other ones. The most important and visible of these is the Caliphate O.T.O., incorporated by Crowley's student Grady McMurtry in 1979.

Originally it was intended to be modeled after and associated with European Freemasonry, such as Masonic Templar organizations, but under the leadership of Aleister Crowley, O.T.O. was reorganized around Crowley's Thelema as its central religious principle.

Similar to many secret societies, O.T.O. membership is based on an initiatory system with a series of degree ceremonies that use ritual drama.

The O.T.O. includes the Ecclesia Gnostica Catholica (EGC) or Gnostic Catholic Church. Its central rite, which is public, is Liber XV, The Gnostic Mass.

History

Origins

The early history of O.T.O. is difficult to trace reliably. It originated in Germany or Austria between 1895 and 1906. Its apparent founder was Carl Kellner (1851–1905) (probably with the German spelling Karl), a wealthy Austrian industrialist, in 1895 (although nothing verifiable is known of the Order until 1904). Kellner wanted to establish an Academia Masonica within which high-grade Freemasonic degrees could be conferred in German-speaking nations.
	 
Theodor Reuss (1855–1923) collaborated with Kellner in creating O.T.O. and succeeded him as head of O.T.O. after Kellner's death. Under Reuss, charters were given to occult brotherhoods in France, Denmark, Switzerland, the United States, and Austria. There were ten degrees, of which the first five were Masonic. 
	 
In 1902, Reuss, along with Franz Hartmann and Henry Klein, purchased the right to perform the Rite of Memphis and Mizraim of Freemasonry from English Freemason John Yarker, the authority of which was confirmed in 1904 and again in 1905. Although these rites are considered to be irregular, they, along with the Swedenborg Rite formed the core of the newly established Order. Kellner, Reuss, Hartmann, and Klein acquired authority to operate the rites of the Martinist Order from French Occultist Gérard Encausse and a clandestine form of the Scottish Rite deriving from Joseph Cerneau. From William Wynn Westcott, Reuss acquired a warrant to start a college of the Societas Rosicruciana in Anglia in Germany.

In 1902, Reuss began publishing a masonic journal, The Oriflamme, as the organ of these collected rites. Reuss's rites aroused some degree of curiosity in the German-speaking Masonic milieu, as high degree Freemasonry had not been very widespread in Germany during the 1800s.  The O.T.O. had several hundred members and affiliates at its peak, but by 1905 and after Kellner's death, Reuss began to lose his supporters. He was attacked in Masonic periodicals for his alleged lack of Masonic regularity and credentials, and for the alleged homosexual elements in Reuss's initiations. Reuss left Germany and moved to London in 1906, and lost control of most of the lodges previously belonging to the O.T.O. network.

In 1908, Encausse invited to Reuss to an "International Masonic Conference", where he probably met Joanny Bricaud and was introduced to his Gnostic Catholic Church (E.G.C.), an off-shoot of Jules Doinel's Église Gnostique. Later O.T.O. documents would present the Order being linked to the E.G.C, and subsequently portray the E.G.C. of O.T.O. as being autonomous with respect to Bricaud's organization.

The sex magic of the higher O.T.O. degrees appears to be based on the writings of the American Occultist Paschal Beverly Randolph (1825–1875), which were adopted by the Hermetic Brotherhood of Luxor (or of Light), another group which Kellner had supposedly been in contact and whose teachings O.T.O. claimed to incorporate. Scholar Marco Pasi notes, however, that there is no evidence in support of this, and suggests that Reuss acquired sexual ideas and techniques from Yarker, who had in his possession certain unpublished writings by Randolph.

Ordo Templi Orientis and Aleister Crowley

Reuss met Aleister Crowley and in 1910 admitted him to the first three degrees of O.T.O. Two years later, Crowley was placed in charge of Great Britain and Ireland, and was advanced to the X° (tenth degree). The appointment included the opening of the British section of O.T.O., which was called the Mysteria Mystica Maxima or the M∴M∴M∴. Crowley then went to Berlin to obtain instructional manuscripts and the title of Supreme and Holy King of Ireland, Iona and all the Britains within the Sanctuary of the Gnosis. Within the year, Crowley had written the Manifesto of the M∴M∴M∴ which described its basic ten-degree system with Kellner's three degree Academia Masonica forming the seventh, eighth and ninth degrees.

In 1913, Crowley composed the Gnostic Mass while in Moscow, which he described as being the Order's "central ceremony of its public and private celebration". In 1914, soon after World War I broke out, he moved to the United States. It was around this time that Crowley decided to integrate Thelema into the O.T.O. system, and in 1915 prepared revised rituals for use in the M∴M∴M∴.

In 1917, Reuss wrote a Synopsis of Degrees of O.T.O. in which the third degree was listed as "Craft of Masonry" and listed the initiations involved as "Entered Apprentice, Fellow Craft, Master Mason" and elaborated on this with "Full instruction in Craft Masonry, including the Catechism of the first three degrees, and an explanation of all the various Masonic systems". The same document shows that the fourth degree of O.T.O. is also known as the Holy Royal Arch of Enoch. It was summarized by Reuss as the Degree of "Scotch Masonry", equivalent to "Scotch Mason, Knight of St. Andrew, Royal Arch", and he described it as "Full instruction in the Scottish degrees of Ancient and Accepted Masonry".

In 1919, Crowley attempted to work this Masonic-based O.T.O. in Detroit, Michigan. The result was that he was rebuffed by the Council of the Scottish rite on the basis that O.T.O. rituals were too similar to orthodox Masonry. He described this in a 1930 letter to Arnold Krumm-Heller:

Crowley subsequently rewrote the initiation rituals of the first three degrees, and in doing so removed most of those rituals' ties to Masonry. He did not, however, rewrite the fourth degree ritual, which remains in its form and structure related to the various Royal Arch rituals of Masonry.

Crowley wrote that Theodore Reuss suffered a stroke in the spring of 1920. In correspondence with one of Reuss' officers, Crowley expressed doubts about Reuss' competence to remain in office. Relations between Reuss and Crowley began to deteriorate, and the two exchanged angry letters in November 1921. Crowley informed Reuss that he was availing himself of Reuss' abdication from office and proclaiming himself Outer Head of the Order. Reuss died on October 28, 1923, without designating a successor, though Crowley claimed in later correspondence that Reuss had designated him. Crowley's biographer Lawrence Sutin, among others, casts doubt on this claim, although there is no evidence for or against it, and no other candidate stepped forward to refute Crowley by offering proof of succession. In 1925, during a tumultuous Conference of Grand Masters, Crowley was officially elected as Outer Head of the Order (or O.H.O.) by the remaining administrative heads of O.T.O.

During this period, O.T.O. members outside of the USA rarely came into contact with one another.:  Since the total membership of O.T.O. at that time was counted in the dozens rather than in hundreds or thousands, this may simply have been Crowley's attempt at disguising the low numbers.

During World War II, the European branches of O.T.O. were either destroyed or driven underground. By the end of the war, the only surviving O.T.O. body was Agapé Lodge in California, although there were various initiates in different countries. Very few initiations were being performed. At this time, Karl Germer, who had been Crowley's representative in Germany, migrated to the United States after being released from Nazi confinement. On March 14, 1942, Crowley appointed him as his successor as Outer Head of the Order, and Germer filled the office after the death of Crowley in 1947.

Ordo Templi Orientis after Aleister Crowley
After Crowley's death, Germer attempted to keep O.T.O. running, with questionable success. Crowley had granted a charter to run an O.T.O. Camp in England to Gerald Gardner, and Germer acknowledged Gardner as the O.T.O.'s main representative in Europe. The two men met in 1948 in New York to discuss plans, but Gardner's continuing ill health led to Germer replacing him with Frederic Mellinger in 1951. Also in 1951, Germer granted a charter to run an O.T.O. Camp in England to Kenneth Grant, who had briefly served as Crowley's secretary during the 1940s. Grant was to be expelled and his charter revoked in 1955 however, and from that time onwards the O.T.O.'s representative in the UK was a IX° member, Noel Fitzgerald.

Germer died in 1962 without naming a successor. It was not until 1969 that Grady McMurtry invoked emergency authorization from Crowley and became the Frater Superior of O.T.O. McMurtry did not claim the title of Outer Head of the Order, stating in 1974 that "There is at present no Outer Head of the Order for Aleister Crowley's Ordo Templi Orientis. The Outer Head of the Order is an international office (see p. 201, The Blue Equinox) and Aleister Crowley's Ordo Templi Orientis is not at this time established organizationally to fulfill the requirements of its Constitution in this respect." He began performing initiations in 1970. O.T.O. was incorporated under the laws of the State of California on March 26, 1979. The corporation attained federal tax exemption as a religious entity under IRS Code 501(c)3 in 1982. Grady McMurtry died in 1985.

McMurtry requested that members of the Sovereign Sanctuary of the Gnosis (i.e. the members of the Ninth Degree) elect the next Caliph, which they did in 1985. William Breeze was elected, taking the name Hymenaeus Beta. In the Fall 1995 issue of The Magical Link, he is designated "Hymenaeus Beta X°"; in the Fall 1997 issue of The Magical Link, he is designated "Hymenaeus Beta XI°"; by May 2005, he is designated "O.H.O. Hymenaeus Beta XII°" on the O.T.O. website.

In 1996, Sabazius X° was appointed as National Grand Master General (G.M.G.) for the U.S. Grand Lodge. In 2005, Frater Hyperion X° was appointed the National G.M.G. of the newly formed UK Grand Lodge. Frater Shiva X° was appointed the G.M.G. of the Australia Grand Lodge in 2006. In 2014, Frater Abrasax X° was appointed the National G.M.G. of the newly formed  Grand Lodge of Croatia, and Frater Phanes X° was appointed the National G.M.G. of the newly formed Grand Lodge of Italy. On October 14, 2014, these five National Grand Masters elected Hymenaeus Beta as "de jure" Outer Head of the Order.

Philosophy of Ordo Templi Orientis
O.T.O. was described by Crowley as the "first of the great Old Æon orders to accept The Book of the Law". O.T.O. originally borrowed ritual material from irregular Masonic organizations, and although some related symbolism and language remains in use, the context has changed to Thelema and its tenets.

O.T.O. has two core areas of ritual activity: initiation into the Mysteries, and the celebration of Liber XV, the Gnostic Mass. In addition, the Order organizes lectures, classes, social events, theatrical productions and artistic exhibitions, publishes books and journals, and provides instruction in Hermetic science, yoga, and magick.

Crowley wrote in his Confessions:

Of the first set of initiations, he wrote:

The initiation rituals after the V° (fifth degree) are such that:

Of the entire system of O.T.O., Crowley wrote in Confessions:

Initiation and teachings
Membership in O.T.O. is based upon a system of initiation ceremonies (or degrees) that use ritual drama to establish fraternal bonds between members as well as impart spiritual and philosophical teachings.

The degrees serve an organizational function, in that certain degrees must be attained before taking on various forms of service in the Order (e.g. taking the degree of K.E.W. is a requirement for ordination as a priest or priestess in Ecclesia Gnostica Catholica).

There are thirteen numbered degrees and twelve un-numbered degrees which are divided into three grades or "triads"—the Hermit, the Lover, and the Man of Earth.

Admittance to each degree of O.T.O. involves an initiation and the swearing of an oath which O.T.O claims is similar to those used in Freemasonry.

Advancement through the Man of Earth triad requires sponsorship from ranking members.  Advancement into the degree of the Knight of the East and West and beyond requires one to be invited by ranking members.

The ultimate goal of initiation in O.T.O. is "to instruct the individual by allegory and symbol in the profound mysteries of Nature, and thereby to assist each to discover his or her own true Identity".

The entire system is as follows:

The Man of Earth Triad 

 0°—Minerval
 I°—Man & Brother
 II°—Magician
 III°—Master Magician
 IV°—Perfect Magician & Companion of the Holy Royal Arch of Enoch
P.I.—Perfect Initiate, or Prince of Jerusalem

Outside all Triads 

 Knight of the East & West

The Lover Triad 

 V°—
 Sovereign Prince Rose-Croix, and Knight of the Pelican & Eagle
Knight of the Red Eagle, and Member of the Senate of Knight Hermetic Philosophers
 VI°—
 Illustrious Knight (Templar) of the Order of Kadosch, and Companion of the Holy Graal
Grand Inquisitor Commander, and Member of the Grand Tribunal
Prince of the Royal Secret
 VII°—
 Theoreticus, and Very Illustrious Sovereign Grand Inspector General
Magus of Light, and Bishop of Ecclesia Gnostica Catholica
Grandmaster of Light, and Inspector of Rites & Degrees

The Hermit Triad 

 VIII°—
 Perfect Pontiff of the Illuminati
Epopt of the Illuminati
 IX°—Initiate of the Sanctuary of the Gnosis
 X°—Rex Summus Sanctissimus
 XI°—Initiate of the Eleventh Degree (This degree is technical, and has no relation to the general plan of the Order)
 XII°—Frater Superior, and Outer Head of the Order

Structure
The governing bodies of O.T.O. include:
International Headquarters
Presided over by the Outer Head of the Order XII° (O.H.O.—also known as Frater Superior)
Supreme Council
Revolutionaries
The Sovereign Sanctuary of the Gnosis of the IX°
The Secret Areopagus of the Illuminati of the VIII°
The Grand Tribunal of the VI°
The National Grand Lodge
Presided over by the National Grand Master X°
Executive Council
The Supreme Grand Council
The Electoral College

International
 The International Headquarters is the body that governs O.T.O. worldwide. As a ruling body, it is known as the International Supreme Council, which consists of the Outer Head of the Order (O.H.O.—also known as Frater Superior), the Secretary-General, and the Treasurer General.
 The Sovereign Sanctuary of the Gnosis consists of members who have reached the IX°. Their prime duty is to study and practice the theurgy and thaumaturgy of the degree, consisting of the Supreme Secret of the Order. However, as a ruling body, they have the authority to
ratify and overturn the rulings of the Areopagus
act as representatives of the O.H.O. and National Grand Masters when need arises
fill the office of Revolutionary
vote within the Secret Areopagus
have some powers over the installation and removal of the O.H.O. and National Grand Masters
 The Secret Areopagus of the Illuminati is a philosophical Governing Body composed of those who have reached the VIII°. It has the authority to reverse the decisions of the Grand Tribunal.
 The Grand Tribunal is composed of members of the degree of Grand Inquisitor Commander (a sub-degree of the VI°). Their primary duty is to hear and arbitrate disputes and complaints not resolved at the level of Chapters and Lodges.

National
 At the national level, the highest body is the Grand Lodge, which is ruled by the National Grand Master. Within the Grand Lodge is an Executive Council, which consists of the Board of Directors, who are the National Grand Master, the Grand Secretary General, and the Grand Treasurer General.
 The Supreme Grand Council consists of members of the VII° appointed by the National Grand Master X°. They are charged with:
the government of the whole of the Lovers Triad
Hearing and deciding appeals of the decisions of the Electoral College
Hearing reports of the Sovereign Grand Inspectors General VII° as to the affairs of the Initiate members of the Lovers Triad
 The Electoral College consists of eleven members of the V° and is the first of the governing bodies. Its primary duty is to oversee the affairs of the Man of Earth Triad.

O.T.O. has a federally recognized tax-exempt status in the United States under IRS section 501c(3). It also has California charitable corporation status.

Current Grand Lodges
The US Grand Lodge is the governing body of O.T.O. in the United States. The U.S. National Grand Master is Sabazius X°, who was appointed in 1996.

According to its website, the Mission Statement of U.S.G.L. is as follows:

As of Feb 28, 2014, US Grand Lodge had 1,508 members in 62 local bodies. The UK Grand Lodge is the governing body of O.T.O. in the United Kingdom. The UK National Grand Master is Frater Hyperion X°, who was appointed in 2005 (93 years after the last Grand Master for the UK, Aleister Crowley, was elevated to that office). The Australian Grand Lodge is the governing body of O.T.O. in Australia and its territories were chartered in April 2006. The A.G.L. National Grand Master is Frater Shiva X°. The Croatian Grand Lodge is the governing body of O.T.O. in Croatia and its territories, chartered in May  2014. The C.G.L. National Grand Master is Frater Abrasax X°. The Italian Grand Lodge is the governing body of O.T.O. in Italy and its territories, chartered in May  2014. The I.G.L. National Grand Master is Frater Phanes X°.

The Gnostic Catholic Church

The Ecclesia Gnostica Catholica, or Gnostic Catholic Church, is the ecclesiastical arm of O.T.O. Its central activity is the celebration of Liber XV, The Gnostic Mass. In recent years, other rites have been written and approved for use within the church. These include Baptism, Confirmation (into the Laity), and Ordination (for Deacons, Priests & Priestesses, and Bishops), and Last Rites. There are also several "unofficial" rituals that are celebrated within the context of E.G.C., including Weddings, Visitation, and Administration of the Virtues to the Sick, Exorcism, and Rites for Life and Greater Feasts.

O.T.O. bodies
At the Man of Earth level, there are three levels of Local Body, which are Camps, Oases, and Lodges.
Camps tend to be the smallest and are not required to perform initiations. They are encouraged to celebrate the Gnostic Mass.
Oases must be capable of initiating through the III° and are required to perform the Gnostic Mass six times yearly.
Lodges are expected to celebrate the Gnostic Mass on a regular basis, work towards establishing a permanent temple, and have the ability to initiate through IV°/P.I.
Chapters of Rose Croix are bodies established by members of the Lover Grade. A Chapter is headed by a Most Wise Sovereign. They are generally charged with arranging social activities, such as plays, banquets, and dances. They also work to promote harmony among the members through tact and friendliness.
Guilds are groups recognized by O.T.O. International designed to promote a profession, trade, science, or craft. Subject to approval by the Areopagus, they make their own regulations and coordinate their own efforts. There are currently three Guilds: the Psychology Guild, the Translators' Guild, and the Information Technology Guild.
The term sanctuary is sometimes used to indicate a group of initiates organized for E.G.C. activities. This designation currently reflects no formal chartering process or official standing within the Order.

Questions of legitimacy
Several competing factions have claimed to be legitimate heirs to Aleister Crowley. Both before and after McMurtry revived O.T.O. in California, others came forward with various claims of succession.

Although Karl Germer expelled Kenneth Grant from O.T.O. in 1955, Grant went on to claim himself as Outer Head of Ordo Templi Orientis in a series of influential books. His organization has recently changed its name to the Typhonian Order and no longer claims to represent O.T.O.

Hermann Metzger, another claimant, had been initiated into O.T.O. under Germer in Germany in the 1950s and headed the Swiss branch of the Order. After Germer's death he attempted to proclaim himself head of O.T.O. However, his claims were ignored by everyone outside of his country and he never pressed the issue. He died in 1990.

Marcelo Ramos Motta (1931–1987), a third claimant, was never initiated into O.T.O. at all, but claimed on the basis that Germer's wife, Sasha, told him that Karl's last words stated that Motta was "the follower." He sued for ownership of Crowley's copyrights, which were denied to him by the U.S. District Court in Maine. Motta died in 1987, although various small groups calling themselves Society O.T.O. (S.O.T.O.) continue to exist and claim authority from him.

Court cases
O.T.O. as revived by McMurtry has won two court cases regarding its legitimacy as the continuation of the O.T.O. of Aleister Crowley:
1976: the Superior Court in Calaveras County, California recognizes Grady McMurtry as the authorized representative of O.T.O.
1985: in the 9th Federal District Court in San Francisco, McMurtry is found to be the legitimate head of O.T.O. within the United States, and that O.T.O. under McMurtry is the continuation of the O.T.O. of Aleister Crowley, and the exclusive owner of the names, trademarks, copyrights and other assets of O.T.O. This decision is appealed to the 9th Circuit Court of Appeals and upheld. The Supreme Court declined to hear a final appeal.  After the case, the US O.T.O. purchased the Crowley copyrights from the official receiver, even though the US court decision declared that they were the rightful owners.

The following case is also significant in the Order's history, though it does not have as much bearing on the issue of legitimacy:
2002: The High Court in England and Wales, in Ordo Templi Orientis v. John Symonds, Anthony Naylor and Mandrake Press, finds that O.T.O., as revived by McMurtry, is the sole owner of the copyrights for all of the works of Aleister Crowley. In its particulars of claim, O.T.O. had pleaded two mutually exclusive routes to ownership of the copyrights:
 (a) through Crowley's will as the named beneficiary O.T.O., a route to the title that had been affirmed in U.S. Federal Court but had never been tested under English law, and
 (b) the "bankruptcy route", on which theory O.T.O. acquired title to the copyrights from 1991 from the UK Crown Official Receiver in Bankruptcy.

The Chancery Master agreed that these two routes were largely mutually exclusive; if Crowley's copyrights were not an asset in his undischarged bankruptcy, then O.T.O. bought nothing, and could only claim through the will, under which the copyrights would have to pass; but if the rights were an asset in bankruptcy, then Crowley had lacked any power to make O.T.O. a bequest of them in his will. The court examined the bankruptcy aspect first, finding that O.T.O. acquired a good title.

The copyrights were thus Crown property between 1935 and 1991, making dozens of books—even many of O.T.O.'s own editions—unauthorized. Had the "will route" been tried, it would have given O.T.O. an opportunity to gain recognition in UK court as the legitimate continuation of Crowley's O.T.O. since that is a precondition to being found the rightful beneficiary of his will. Thus, the issue of the organization's legitimacy did arise at trial, since it was pleaded in court, but it was not ruled upon. While there is no way to know whether, had it been tested, it would have been confirmed or denied, O.T.O. made thorough legal preparations for this aspect of their case as detailed in their "Particulars of Claim".  However, it would be misleading to cite this case as affirming the organization's historical legitimacy, since that issue went untried.

In Australia in 2005, O.T.O. began a defamation case against the site GaiaGuys for material put up on their website that directly accused O.T.O., particularly in Australia, of participating in acts of child abuse and sacrifice. The court found in favour of O.T.O.

In June 2008 O.T.O. won a trademark case on appeal in the UK: "OTO", "O.T.O." "Ordo Templi Orientis" and the OTO Lamen were confirmed to be trademarks of the order.

Criticisms 
In February 2006, a long-time high-ranking member and occult author, T. Allen Greenfield, called for the resignation of upper management and stepped down from all managerial duties in protest. He went on to write a detailed analysis of "the failure of the O.T.O." and the "culture of fear" which he says currently exists within O.T.O. which is included as the last chapter and Epilogue of his book The Roots of Modern Magick. Although he is no longer a member of O.T.O. he continues to be a critic of the current Frater Superior of the Order, Hymenaeus Beta.

See also

 Esotericism in Germany and Austria
 Hermetic Qabalah
 Hermeticism
 Magical organization
 Sex magic
 Secret society

Notes

References 
 {{cite book |last=Crowley |first=Aleister |title=The Confessions of Aleister Crowley: An Autohagiography. |year=1979 |place=London; Boston |publisher=Routledge & Kegan Paul |isbn=0-7100-0175-4}}
 del Campo, Gerald. (1994). New Aeon Magick: Thelema Without Tears. St. Paul, Minnesota : Llewellyn Publications.
 Evans, Dave (2007). Aleister Crowley and the 20th Century Synthesis of Magick. Hidden Press, Second Revised Edition. 
 Hymenaeus Beta (ed.) (1990) The Equinox: Vol.III, No.10. York Beach Samuel Weiser 
 Kaczynski, Richard. (2002). Perdurabo, The Life of Aleister Crowley. New Falcon Publications 
 King, Francis (1973). The Secret Rituals of the O.T.O. Samuel Weiser, Inc. 
 King, Francis (1978). The Magical World of Aleister Crowley.'' Coward, McCann & Geoghegan.

External links

 International Headquarters, O.T.O.
 US Grand Lodge, O.T.O.
 The Invisible Basilica of Sabazius
 A Statement Regarding the Ordo Templi Orientis  by Allen H. Greenfield
 The Ordo Templi Orientis Phenomenon
 The Ordo Templi Orientis is an academic history of the O.T.O. by Christian Giudice, published in The Occult World, ed. by Christopher Partridge (Routledge, 2014)

 
Irish secret societies
Japanese secret societies
Religious organizations established in the 1900s
Secret societies in Bulgaria
Secret societies in Canada
Secret societies in Finland
Secret societies in Germany
Secret societies in Greece
Secret societies in Poland
Secret societies in Russia
Secret societies in Serbia
Secret societies in Spain
Secret societies in the United Kingdom
Secret societies in the United States